John Pilgrim (24 September 1860 – 11 March 1925) was a Barbadian cricketer. He played in three first-class matches for the Barbados cricket team in 1891/92.

See also
 List of Barbadian representative cricketers

References

External links
 

1860 births
1925 deaths
Barbadian cricketers
Barbados cricketers
People from Saint John, Barbados